Plasmodium fairchildi is a parasite of the genus Plasmodium.

Like all Plasmodium species it has vertebrate and insect hosts. The vertebrate hosts are reptiles. The insect vector is not known.

Description 

This species was described by Telford in 1989.

Geographic occurrence 

This species has been described in the Caribbean island of Hispaniola.

Clinical features and host pathology 

The only known host is the lizard Anolis cupreus.

Note

Two subspecies were recognised  Plasmodium fairchildi fairchildi and Plasmodium fairchildi hispaniolae but the latter has been elevated to species level as Plasmodium hispaniolae.

References

Further reading

fairchildi